Get as Much Love as You Can is the third album by  The Jones Girls. Released in 1981, the album reached number twenty-five on the Top Soul Albums chart in the United States.

Track listing
"(I Found) That Man of Mine"  (Kenny Gamble, Leon Huff)  4:11
"Get As Much Love As You Can"  (Kenny Gamble, Leon Huff)  4:23
"Nights Over Egypt" (Cynthia Biggs, Dexter Wansel)  4:40
"Love Don't Ever Say Goodbye" (Cynthia Biggs, Dexter Wansel)  4:38
"ASAP (As Soon As Possible)" (McKinley Jackson, Shirley Jones)  4:16
"Let's Be Friends First (Then Lovers)" (McKinley Jackson, Shirley Jones)  5:26
"The World Will Sing Our Song" (Phyllis St. James)  4:05
"You're Breakin' My Heart"  (Kenny Gamble, Leon Huff)  4:16

Charts

Singles

References

External links
 The Jones Girls-Get as Much Love as You Can at Discogs

1981 albums
The Jones Girls albums
Philadelphia International Records albums
Albums produced by Leon Huff
Albums recorded at Sigma Sound Studios